Adrien Théaux (born 18 September 1984) is a French World Cup alpine ski racer and non-commissioned officer. He made his World Cup debut in February 2004 at age 19.

Théaux represented France at three Winter Olympics and seven World Championships; his best finish is a bronze medal in the Super-G in 2015 at Beaver Creek, Colorado.

Through November 2020, he has three World Cup victories and thirteen podiums.

World Cup results

Season standings

Race podiums
 3 wins – (3 DH)
 13 podiums – (6 DH, 6 SG, 1 AC)

World Championship results

Olympic results

References

External links
 
 
 
 French Ski Team – 2023 men's A team 
 Head Skis – athletes – race – Adrien Théaux
  

1984 births
Sportspeople from Tarbes
French male alpine skiers
Alpine skiers at the 2010 Winter Olympics
Alpine skiers at the 2014 Winter Olympics
Olympic alpine skiers of France
Living people
Audi Sport TT Cup drivers
Alpine skiers at the 2018 Winter Olympics
21st-century French people